Abington is a surname. Notable people with the surname include:

 Bill Abington (1921–2014), American politician
 Edward Abington (disambiguation)
 Eustace Abington, 16th-century English politician
 Frances Abington (1737–1815), British actress
 Henry Abington  (c.1418–1497), English ecclesiastic and musician
 Thomas Abington

References